Byszów may refer to the following places in Poland:
Byszów, Lower Silesian Voivodeship (south-west Poland)
Byszów, Świętokrzyskie Voivodeship (south-central Poland)